The Russian Second Division 1998 was the seventh edition of the Russian Second Division. The competition was renamed from Russian Second League to Russian Second Division this year. Russian Third League was dissolved this season and Second Division became once again the lowest level of professional football in Russia. There were 6 zones with 119 teams starting the competition (5 were excluded before the end of the season).

Zone West

Overview

Standings

Top goalscorers
32 goals
Aleksei Snigiryov (FC Torpedo-ZIL Moscow)

23 goals
Anatoli Balaluyev (FC Avtomobilist Noginsk)

18 goals
Aleksei Kocharygin (FC Spartak-2 Moscow)
Sergey Korovushkin (PFC CSKA-2 Moscow)

17 goals
Maksim Grevtsev (FC Spartak Shchyolkovo)
Sergei Lutovinov (FC Spartak-2 Moscow)

16 goals
Maksim Aristarkhov (FC Torpedo-2 Moscow)

15 goals
Yuri Bagdasaryan (FC Mosenergo Moscow)
Yuriy Yakovenko  (FC Torpedo-ZIL Moscow)

14 goals
Dmitri Rudanov (FC Neftyanik Yaroslavl)

Zone Center

Overview

Standings

Top goalscorers
24 goals
Aleksei Medvedev (FC Spartak-Orekhovo Orekhovo-Zuyevo)

21 goals
Anatoli Sigachyov (FC Don Novomoskovsk)

19 goals
Andrei Boldin (FC Kolomna)

17 goals
Sergei Gavrilov (FC Spartak Tambov)

16 goals
Mikhail Filyunov (FC Oryol)

15 goals
Konstantin Kaynov (FC Fabus Bronnitsy)
Valeri Korneyev (FC Spartak Bryansk)

14 goals
Yevgeni Kuzka (FC Spartak Ryazan)

12 goals
Igor Grokhovskiy  (FC Arsenal-2 Tula)
Vladimir Kharin (FC Lokomotiv Liski)
Andrei Meshchaninov (FC Kosmos Dolgoprudny)
Aleksandr Rogachyov (FC Spartak Lukhovitsy)

Zone South

Overview

Standings

Top goalscorers
29 goals
Yusup Guguyev (FC Angusht Nazran)

28 goals
Aleksandr Krotov (FC Volgar-Gazprom Astrakhan)

26 goals
Isa Markhiyev (FC Angusht Nazran)

20 goals
Ihor Stasyuk  (FC Torpedo Taganrog)
Aleksandr Tatarkin (FC Volgar-Gazprom Astrakhan)
Stanislav Tskhovrebov (FC Avtodor Vladikavkaz)

16 goals
Andranik Babayan (FC Volgar-Gazprom Astrakhan)
Aleksei Burlutskiy (FC Torpedo Taganrog)

14 goals
Grigori Ivanov (FC Volgar-Gazprom Astrakhan)
Andrey Perederiy (FC Avtodor Vladikavkaz)

Zone Povolzhye

Overview

Standings

Top goalscorers
31 goals
Andrei Bakalets (FC Torpedo-Viktoriya Nizhny Novgorod)

15 goals
Aleksandr Fedoseyev (FC Zenit Penza)

14 goals
Mikhail Mysin (FC Rotor-2 Volgograd)
 Aleksandr Popov (FC Iskra Engels)

13 goals
Rafael Khayrulov (FC Energiya Ulyanovsk)
Yuri Konovalov (FC Torpedo Volzhsky)

12 goals
Anatoli Lychagov (FC Energiya Uren)
Igor Mordvinov (FC Torpedo Pavlovo)
Vitali Papadopulo (FC Torpedo Arzamas)

11 goals
Oleg Sofonov (FC Torpedo Pavlovo)

Zone Ural

Overview

Standings

Top goalscorers

30 goals
Konstantin Paramonov (FC Amkar Perm)

28 goals
Vladimir Filippov (FC Nosta Novotroitsk)

19 goals
Andrei Ivanov (FC Energiya Chaikovsky)
Sergei Kireyev (FC Zenit Chelyabinsk)
Vladimir Raykov (FC UralAZ Miass)

17 goals
Konstantin Zyryanov (FC Amkar Perm)

14 goals
 Serhiy Yakovenko (FC Energiya Chaikovsky)

13 goals
Lev Matveyev (FC Amkar Perm)
Yawhen Tsarkov  (FC Zenit Chelyabinsk)

12 goals
Aleksei Alekseyev (FC Uralmash Yekaterinburg)
Denis Malyavkin (FC Metallurg-Metiznik Magnitogorsk)
Vladimir Pantyushenko (FC Samotlor-XXI Nizhnevartovsk)
Sergei Sviridkin (FC Gazovik Orenburg)

Zone East

Overview

Standings

Top goalscorers
13 goals
Sergei Bogdanov (FC Metallurg Krasnoyarsk)
Igor Zykov (FC Selenga Ulan-Ude)

10 goals
Stanislav Chaplygin (FC Metallurg Novokuznetsk)
Anatoli Panchenko (FC Dynamo Barnaul)
Vladimir Shipovskiy (FC Metallurg Novokuznetsk)

9 goals
Viktor Kuchin (FC Metallurg Novokuznetsk)
Oleg Nikulin (FC Chkalovets Novosibirsk)
Oleg Yakovlev (FC Zvezda Irkutsk)

8 goals
Vadim Belokhonov (FC Metallurg Krasnoyarsk)
Pavel Bondarenko (FC SKA Khabarovsk)
Vyacheslav Kholosha (FC Zvezda Irkutsk)
Roman Melnik (FC Luch Vladivostok)
Aleksei Tikhonkikh (FC Selenga Ulan-Ude)
Igor Yefremov (FC Amur-Energiya Blagoveshchensk)

See also
1998 Russian Top Division
1998 Russian First Division

3
1998
Russia
Russia